Doľany is a village and municipality in western Slovakia in  Pezinok District in the Bratislava region.

Genealogical resources

The records for genealogical research are available at the state archive "Statny Archiv in Bratislava, Slovakia"

 Roman Catholic church records (births/marriages/deaths): 1638-1927 (parish A)

See also
 List of municipalities and towns in Slovakia

References

External links

 Official page

Surnames of living people in Dolany

Villages and municipalities in Pezinok District